Kramfors-Alliansen is a sports club in Kramfors, Sweden. The ice hockey section currently participates in the Swedish Division 2, the fourth-level of ice hockey in Sweden. They have previously participated in the Swedish Division 1, both when it was the second and third-level Swedish league. 

The club was known as "Kramfors IF" until 1971, when Kramfors IF and Östby IF merged to form Kramfors-Alliansen.

References

External links
Official website
Team profile on eurohockey.com

Ice hockey teams in Sweden
Ice hockey teams in Västernorrland County